The Bramble Bank, otherwise known simply as "The Brambles" is an arrowhead-shaped sandbar in the central Solent which is uncovered at low water spring tides. At other times it presents either a significant navigational hazard or a useful escape from the strong Solent tides. The bank is moving very slowly westward, but is roughly equidistant between the entrance to Southampton Water in the north and the mouth of the River Medina in the south. It is marked at its southeastern limit by the Brambles post sea mark and on its western limit by the West Knoll buoy.

The Brambles post has comprehensive weather and sea state monitoring equipment which is relayed in realtime to a website.

The sandbar is known for the annual cricket match held there, when the Royal Southern Yacht Club (RSrnYC) play the Island Sailing Club.

Cricket match
Each year, the Royal Southern Yacht Club (RSrnYC) and the Island Sailing Club meet on the sandbar for a game of cricket. The match takes place when the bank is exposed but never lasts very long before the tide returns. The undulating surface with large puddles ensures it is more a social occasion than a serious cricket match, and the scoring reflects this - the victor of the game is pre-determined, and the two clubs simply take it in turns to "win" the match, regardless of play. The first match is said to have been played in the 1950s at the behest of pioneering British boatmaker Uffa Fox.

The Brambles cricket match has been described as "quintessentially English" and has even drawn the attention of a House of Commons Standing Committee, when it was mentioned as a light-hearted example of an event which falls geographically between the boundaries of two different licensing authorities.

Accidents

On Tuesday 11 November 2008, on approaching Southampton Docks for her last visit prior to retirement, the Cunard liner Queen Elizabeth 2 ran aground on the Bramble Bank at approximately 0530 hrs. She required four tugs to pull her clear on the rising tide and arrived in Southampton approximately 90 minutes late.

On 3 January 2015 the car transporter  was beached on the bank after developing a list. A 200-metre maritime exclusion zone was put into in place around the ship until the salvage operation took place, and airspace below 2,000 ft was also closed to aircraft within . She was refloated on the rising tide on 7 January 2015, and was towed 2 miles east of the bank and moored between East Cowes and Lee on the Solent to await further salvage operations.

Shortly before 10pm on 13 February 2016 the  container ship APL Vanda ran aground on the bank. Several  tugs and crew from Calshot lifeboat station attended and, within a couple of hours, the ship was refloated on the rising tide.

In popular culture
Bramble Bank is shown and labelled on maps of the Solent in Ship Simulator 2008 and Ship Simulator Extremes, but doesn't pose any threat to the player due to an absence of low tide in those games.

References

External links

BRAMBLEMET - Weather Reports from Bramble Bank
The 2005 Bramble Bank Cricket Match photo archive

The Solent
Sandbanks of England